Portsmouth is a city in Shelby County, Iowa, United States. The population was 182 at the time of the 2020 census.

History
The first permanent settlement at Portsmouth was made by William Williams, who built a log cabin home there in the 1860s.

Portsmouth had its start in the year 1882 when the Chicago, Milwaukee and St. Paul railway platted the town along its tracks.

Geography
Portsmouth is located at  (41.650730, -95.519669).

Demographics

2010 census
As of the census of 2010, there were 195 people, 94 households, and 59 families living in the city. The racial makeup of the city was 98.5% White, 0.5% African American, and 1.0% from two or more races.

There were 94 households, of which 19.1% had children under the age of 18 living with them, 47.9% were married couples living together, 10.6% had a female householder with no husband present, 4.3% had a male householder with no wife present, and 37.2% were non-families. 33.0% of all households were made up of individuals, and 18.1% had someone living alone who was 65 years of age or older. The average household size was 2.07 and the average family size was 2.56.

The median age in the city was 51.2 years. 16.9% of residents were under the age of 18; 4.1% were between the ages of 18 and 24; 21.5% were from 25 to 44; 30.9% were from 45 to 64; and 26.7% were 65 years of age or older. The gender makeup of the city was 52.3% male and 47.7% female.

2000 census
As of the census of 2000, there were 225 people, 96 households, and 62 families living in the city. The racial makeup of the city was 99.56% White, and 0.44% from two or more races. Hispanic or Latino of any race were 0.44% of the population.

There were 96 households, out of which 26.0% had children under the age of 18 living with them, 53.1% were married couples living together, 9.4% had a female householder with no husband present, and 35.4% were non-families. 29.2% of all households were made up of individuals, and 19.8% had someone living alone who was 65 years of age or older. The average household size was 2.34 and the average family size was 2.89.

In the city, the population was spread out, with 23.6% under the age of 18, 7.1% from 18 to 24, 25.3% from 25 to 44, 20.0% from 45 to 64, and 24.0% who were 65 years of age or older. The median age was 40 years. For every 100 females, there were 94.0 males. For every 100 females age 18 and over, there were 89.0 males.

The median income for a household in the city was $28,000, and the median income for a family was $39,250. Males had a median income of $26,818 versus $22,750 for females. The per capita income for the city was $15,473. About 11.9% of families and 14.8% of the population were below the poverty line, including 19.3% of those under the age of eighteen and 9.1% of those 65 or over.

Education
The Harlan Community School District operates local public schools.  The district serves the towns of Harlan, Defiance, Earling, Panama, Portsmouth and Westphalia, the unincorporated communities of Jacksonville and Corley, and the surrounding rural areas.

References

Cities in Shelby County, Iowa
Cities in Iowa